Meaning of Life is the eighth studio album by American singer Kelly Clarkson. It was released by Atlantic Records on October 27, 2017. Executive produced by Clarkson and Craig Kallman, the album is her debut release for the label after completing her recording contract with RCA Records, which she had signed after winning the inaugural season of American Idol. Weary of the structure of the previous record deal where she was strictly limited to releasing pop music, Clarkson wanted to pursue a different genre—soul and R&B music, which she had previously wanted to make and had only finally found the opportunity to do so after being signed by Kallman to the label.

Meaning of Life is Clarkson's second documented large scale foray into soul and R&B music, after her debut single Miss Independent, departing from the predominant pop and pop rock sound established from her previous studio releases and returning to her multi-genre performances on American Idol. Inspired by the music of the 1990s and prominent singers Aretha Franklin, Mariah Carey, Whitney Houston, En Vogue and Bonnie Raitt, Clarkson wanted the album to evoke a music similar to the early works of those artists—with the overall goal of emoting a "soulful" spirit. To achieve this, Clarkson commissioned several collaborators—from previous associates Jesse Shatkin, Greg Kurstin, Mozella and Jason Halbert, to new project partners The Monarch, Mick Schultz, Harlœ and James Morrison. The album's tracks share a cohesive theme of interpersonal connections in life, centered on the subjects of love and living the moment.

Meaning of Life received a generally positive response from music critics, who commended Clarkson's newfound confidence and the cohesiveness of the album. Commercially, the record became her eighth consecutive studio album to debut in the top three of the Billboard 200 chart. Three singles were released to promote the album: "Love So Soft", "I Don't Think About You", and "Heat", the first and last of which topped the Billboard Dance Club Songs chart. Meaning of Life received two Grammy Award nominations for Best Pop Vocal Album and Best Pop Solo Performance for "Love So Soft" at the 60th and 61st ceremony. Its supporting concert tour of the same name visited various arenas throughout the United States between January to March 2019.

Background
After releasing her seventh studio album, Piece by Piece (2015), along with its companion remix album in 2016, Kelly Clarkson had completed the terms of her recording contract with RCA Records and 19 Recordings which she had signed as a prize after winning the inaugural season of American Idol in 2002. As opposed to the previous contract structure where 19 held the phonographic rights to the master recordings, RCA executives Peter Edge and Tom Corson revealed their intentions to sign Clarkson directly to the label without 19's involvement. Their renewal offer would include a three-album deal with a US$1 million advance per album, in contrast to the six-album limit from the previous contract with a US$500,000 incentive per record. Corson also admitted that her relationship with Sony Music executive Clive Davis might prove to be a nuance to the offer.

Despite remarking that her relationship with Edge and Corson on the label had proved to be successful, Clarkson had second thoughts about renewing the contract, which she recalled as an "arranged marriage".  As a result, her management met with Warner Music Nashville executive John Esposito, who brokered a meeting with Atlantic Records executives Craig Kallman and Julie Greenwald, who in turn offered her a long-term worldwide deal with a larger creative freedom. On June 24, 2016, Warner Music Group announced that Clarkson had signed a long-term worldwide recording contract with Atlantic and would immediately work on a soul and R&B album set to be released the following year. The move to Atlantic also reunited her with Pete Ganbarg, who had previously did A&R work for her fourth studio album All I Ever Wanted (2009). Later that year, Kallman and Ganbarg, who was producing A&R work on a mixtape inspired by the Broadway musical Hamilton, invited Clarkson to record the musical number "It's Quiet Uptown" for the mixtape, making it her debut appearance on an Atlantic record.

Recording and production 

Three of Clarkson's producers from Piece by Piece were confirmed to return for Meaning of Life: Greg Kurstin, Jason Halbert, and Jesse Shatkin, whereas first-time collaborators include The Monarch, Nick Ruth, and Mick Schultz. Deviating from the predominant pop rock sound of her previous releases, Clarkson wanted to approach a different genre—soul and R&B music. She revealed that she had previously wanted to record this type of songs but had never found an opportunity to do so, but has found out that Kallman was "dying to make this record" with her and has counted on his full support. She said the new material was reminiscent of the songs she had performed during her tenure on American Idol, and remarked that the album was a "new and fresh thing" for her and made her feel like a "brand new artist again". Recording sessions began after Clarkson's pregnancy in 2016 and continued until 2017.

To avoid making material similar to that of Stronger (2011), Clarkson met with various songwriters and showcased several soulful tracks to them to demonstrate the album's direction. She remarked that her meeting with various writing camps, discussing what kind of songs she wanted from them and rejecting songs that didn't fit the direction of the album was a "different process" for her. Clarkson said that she "wrote a bit", finding inspiration for a song's lyrics in the novel Big Little Lies, but her family life had hindered opportunities for her to contribute more to the writing.  Several songwriters such as Ali Tamposi, Mozella, Harlœ, Sebastian Kole, Diztortion, Warren "Oak" Felder have all confirmed to have submitted material to Clarkson in Nashville.

Clarkson and Kallman ultimately executive produced the entire album, with the latter handling the A&R himself. It marked the first time in ten years Clarkson was credited as an executive producer. She described him as "instrumental" in steering the record, but also allowed her to explore the soulful side of her voice that she once displayed on American Idol and in live concerts. She remarked that he helped her understand what an executive producer credit on an album really meant, saying that he would often push the producers who are used to working with other executives in making radio-friendly hits, but that it sometimes tears the spirit and soul out of it. Both invited several performers to play on the album—Kallman personally invited the soul band Earth, Wind & Fire to perform at the recording sessions for the album's two tracks, while Clarkson requested her touring backup singers—Jessi Collins, Nicole Hurst, and Bridget Sarai, to be given a more prominent feature by accompanying her lead vocals, deviating from the usual practice of recording her own background vocals in her previous albums.

Composition

Theme and influences 

Meaning of Life has a cohesive theme—connection. Lyrical contents of each of the album's tracks center on "love and living, rooted in the past and living in the moment". When asked about what is the "meaning of life" to her, Clarkson remarked that "life is about connection." Clarkson also illustrated the album's logo as a circle to emphasize on life's connection and to indicate that no one is in the middle of it. She added, "This album is not great because of Kelly Clarkson," Kelly admits. "It's great because of all the musicians, all of the singers that are highlighted, all of the engineers, the producers. There are a lot of people that make up an album, and we really wanted to highlight those people." Musically, Clarkson was mainly inspired by the music of the 1990s, along with the early works of vocalists Aretha Franklin, Mariah Carey, Whitney Houston, En Vogue and Bonnie Raitt, whose soulful catalogs have inspired a young Clarkson to sing in high school and later embark on a music career. Franklin became the starting point for inspiration, with Clarkson asking, "What if Aretha was born now and made a record today?" as a guiding principle. In turn, Kallman made sure that the record wouldn't sound old, saying that "it's just not nostalgic and a retro experience" but described it as a "modern experience infused with the best of those records we call standards". Critics described Meaning of Life as a mixture of soulful R&B pop; While some designated it as a "soulful pop"/"pop-soul" album, others illustrated it as a soul and R&B record. Raissa Bruner of Time saw its tracks as "soulful anthems mixed with rollicking empowerment pop", while Josh Bell of the Washington Blade characterized it as "more soulful and R&B-influenced than Clarkson's prior work, although it's still very much a pop album."

Meaning of Life is promulgated by Atlantic as the album she was destined to make with the label, a "sensual" pop record and her first documented soul and R&B album; while Clarkson personally described it as the album she had wanted to make since junior high but also a "grown-ass woman's record", explaining that the lyrical content found on the album may not be suitable for her younger self to make. She remarked, "This is a record you make when you've lived (sic)." Unlike her previous releases where she had co-written much of the material, she felt compelled to only pen a few, saying that taking an active role in writing the songs would have taken an expense on her family life. Clarkson then commissioned material that showcases her current state of mind—such as dealing with the rewards and complications that come with connecting with someone emotionally, mentally, physically in a marriage; as well as a mature woman feeling completely comfortable in her own skin after years of withering sexist criticism about her appearance. To discuss these concepts, she invited several collaborators, including Harlœ, whose conversations with Clarkson were used to create some of the album's lyrical content.

Song analysis 

The album opens with "A Minute (Intro)" as the introductory track. Written and produced by The Monarch with writing input from Jim McCormick and Katie Pearlman, the song is a minute-long anthem for self-care, and was primarily made for Clarkson, whose hectic family and work life have made it hard for her to take a break for a minute for herself. Shatkin, Mozella and Priscilla Renea co-wrote and co-produced the second track "Love So Soft", which is dubbed as a tribute to classic R&B while still sounding contemporary. The Monarch and Mick Schultz produced the third song "Heat", and co-wrote it with Harlœ and Michael Pollack. Clarkson described the song as discussing on giving 100% commitment to one another and as reminiscent of her relationship with her husband. The fourth song and the titular track, "Meaning of Life", was written by British singer James Morrison with Ilsey Juber and Shatkin, who handled its production. Morrison and Shatkin originally presented the song to Clarkson for Piece by Piece, but she felt its theme was unsuitable for the album at the time. She later took a hold on the song and used it as a base point for the other producers in making material for the follow-up album. The fifth, "Move You", was written by Nick Ruth, Amy Kuney, and Molly Kate Kestner. Produced by Ruth, Kuney built the song's framework to bridge the gap between religious and secular music. Clarkson co-wrote the sixth track "Whole Lotta Woman" with Jussifer, Novawav duo Denisia Andrews & Brittany Coney, Fade Majah, and Shatkin. Produced by the latter four, the song is an empowerment anthem for women using metaphors from American Southern culture, primarily with Texan women, whom Clarkson is considered one of. Select members of Earth, Wind & Fire, led by Verdine White, prominently played throughout the number.

Schultz and Harlœ co-wrote and produced the seventh track "Medicine" as a tribute to the '90s with inspiration from Carey's song "Emotions" (1991). The follow-up track "Cruel" was written by The Monarch, Harlœ and Pat Linehan, and was produced by Jason Halbert, which sings of commanding respect from a partner. The Monarch and Shatkin produced the ninth song "Didn't I", which was written by the Davidsons, Audra Mae, and Pearlman. In the song, she bellows at a man for forsaking her after committing herself to him. Based on her experience in witnessing failed relationships of some of her loved ones and asking about a retrospective about it, Clarkson co-wrote the succeeding track "Would You Call that Love" with Greg Kurstin, who produced it. The eleventh song "I Don't Think About You" was written by Harlœ, Michael Pollack, and The Monarch, who handled its production. Requested by Clarkson to write a ballad that showcases her vocals, Harlœ based the song from her past relationship. Ruth, Kuney, and Kestner wrote the twelfth track "Slow Dance", a sultry number which is about a woman demanding a man to take things slowly, instead of falling victim to his advances. Clarkson, Shatkin, and Mozella co-wrote both the album's final two tracks—the penultimate, "Don't You Pretend", is about demanding a man to be honest about his true feelings; and the concluding number "Go High", an anthem which was inspired by former U.S. First Lady Michelle Obama's speech at the 2016 Democratic National Convention.

Release and promotion

Meaning of Life was released by Atlantic and its parent label Warner Music Group on October 27, 2017. Originally scheduled to be issued in June 2017, the release date was pushed back to the year's fall season. Chris Ruff, Atlantic's senior marketing manager, remarked that the album's roll-out strategy would first be driven towards selling physical copies, which would be followed by a promotional campaign with streaming platforms in the following year. The album's lead single "Love So Soft" was released digitally alongside "Move You" on September 7, 2017. "Love So Soft" peaked within the top fifty of the Billboard Hot 100 chart and topped the Billboard Dance Club Songs ranking. A week before the album's release, its titular song "Meaning of Life" was issued as a promotional single on October 19, 2017. "I Don't Think About You" was released as the follow-up single on February 9, 2018, followed by "Heat" as the third single on July 27, 2018. Clarkson has announced plans to do a worldwide tour to support the album following the conclusion of the fourteenth season of The Voice, where she was then currently participating as a coach. On September 14, 2018, she announced the Meaning of Life Tour, which visited selected U.S. cities from January to March 2019.

To promote the album, Clarkson embarked on several intimate concerts in North America. On September 6, 2017, Kallman, Greenwald and Warner Music CEO of Recorded Music Max Lousada jointly presented Clarkson's performance of the album's six selections at the Rainbow Room in New York City. She also filmed a "Nashville Sessions" series at the War Memorial Auditorium in Nashville, with selected performances being eventually released online. On September 28, 2017, she taped an iHeartRadio Secret Session in Toronto, which was broadcast as a radio special the following month. On its release date, Clarkson performed several songs from the album at an album release party hosted by iHeartRadio in Los Angeles. The event was also aired live in simulcast on various iHeartRadio radio stations. In November 2017, she performed on two album release events in New York City—one was hosted by astrophysicist Neil DeGrasse Tyson at YouTube Space and the other at the Gramercy Theatre hosted and tape-broadcast by Sirius XM. American chain store Cracker Barrel also sponsored a "Rocking and Stockings" content series to promote the album during the 2017 holiday season, featuring selected performances by Clarkson.

Clarkson performed numerous selections from Meaning of Life in various televised events. She premiered "Love So Soft" on The Today Show a day after its release date and has performed it on programs such as America's Got Talent, The Ellen DeGeneres Show, The Graham Norton Show, The Late Late Show with James Corden, The Voice of Germany, the 2017 We Day, the 2017 Invictus Games, and the 2017 American Music Awards. She also performed the titular track on Strictly Come Dancing; "I Don't Think About You" on The Ellen DeGeneres Show; "Move You", "I Don't Think About You", and "Didn't I" on The Today Show; "Heat" on The Today Show and the Opening Ceremony of the 2018 US Open; "Whole Lotta Woman" on The Tonight Show Starring Jimmy Fallon, The Late Late Show with James Corden (during Carpool Karaoke), and the 2018 Billboard Music Awards; "I Don't Think About You" and "Didn't I" on Late Night with Seth Meyers; and, "Medicine" and "I Don't Think About You" on The Voice.

Critical reception 

Meaning of Life received a generally positive response from music critics. Consensus from reviews compiled by Gold Derby  reveal that the "intimate, R&B-drenched album is full of confidence," describing its emphasis on soul as "euphorically liberated". On the review aggregator site Metacritic, which assigns a normalized rating out of 100 to reviews from mainstream critics, the album received an average score of 73, based on eight reviews, indicating "generally favorable reviews". AllMusic's senior editor Stephen Thomas Erlewine gave the album a four-star rating, calling it one of her most satisfying albums and commending Clarkson for sounding "assured here in a way that differs from her earliest records". Leah Greenblatt of Entertainment Weekly gave it a "B+" rating. Deeming the album as feeling cohesive and self-assured, she considered that it doesn't seem especially interested in reaching the heights of Clarkson's early hit records but "swings low and sweet — a refreshingly real dispatch from an artist expressing exactly what she feels in this moment." Writing for Time, Bruner wrote that the album "finds her as fans prefer: a confident artist with a sense of humor and sass to spare." Shaun Kitchener of the Daily Express rated the album five stars, writing that Clarkson was "in her absolute element" on it, and the album was a "peppier, more playful alternative to Adele's 25".

Glenn Gamboa of Newsday gave Meaning of Life a four-star rating. Praising it as the best album of Clarkson's career, he wrote that it presented a "chance to declare her ambitions and deliver on them" for her "most cohesive album yet". The Boston Globe correspondent Isaac Feldberg commented that Clarkson "has perhaps never sounded as confident or comfortable as she does" on the album, and that she "channels her delight at [her] newfound freedom into songs that, while signaling a new stage in her career, appear to flow directly from both her heart and soul." Mike Nied of Idolator shared a similar sentiment, saying that "returning to her roots had truly opened a wealth of opportunities" for Clarkson. Craig Jenkins of Vulture described the album as "a simmering pot of warm grooves and powerful vocals, a career pivot to the music that Clarkson ought to have been allowed to make right out of the gate." Reviewing for The Observer, Michael Cragg rated the album four stars, comparing its sound to Meghan Trainor and Mariah Carey and crediting its "big, syrupy" ballads for "accentuating Clarkson's undeniably powerful voice, creating a comfort zone that feels genuine."

Some of the critics were also ambivalent on the album: The Guardians Hannah Davis gave the record a three-star rating, writing that the album had "lots of filler" and notably evoked the records of Christina Aguilera and Trainor, but its "strong, '90s diva-ish mood suits Clarkson's belting vocal style, as she ushers in a more soulful phase with class." Reviewing the album for Spin, Katherine St. Asaph noted that much of it feels "dated, studiously attempting to recreate an era Clarkson's long since transcended", and despite praising her vocal showcase, she was puzzled that after "to hear an album that sounds so much like contractual winner's filler" almost 15 years after winning the competition.

Accolades and honors 
Meaning of Life has received nominations for Best Pop Vocal Album at the 61st Grammy Awards and Best Pop Solo Performance for "Love So Soft" at the 60th ceremony. Both nominations earned Clarkson the distinction of being the most-nominated artist in both categories' history, sharing the Best Pop Vocal Album record with Justin Timberlake. In the midst of promoting the album, Clarkson was also honored at various award-giving programs, including the Powerhouse Award at the 2017 Billboard Women in Music event, Icon Award at the 2018 Radio Disney Music Awards, and a Hall of Fame induction at the 2017 Nickelodeon HALO Awards.

Year-end lists 
Meaning of Life was included on several publications' year-end lists:

 AllMusic, Favorite Pop Albums of 2017
 AXS, 10 Best Pop Albums of 2017
 BBC, Best Albums of 2017
 Billboard, 50 Best Albums of 2017: Critics' Picks
 Entertainment Weekly, 25 Best Albums of 2017

 Idolator, Best Pop Albums & EPs of 2017
 Newsday, Best Albums of 2017
 Rolling Stone, 20 Best Pop Albums of 2017
 Time, Best Albums of 2017 
 Us Weekly, Best Albums of 2017

Commercial performance 
Meaning of Life debuted on the Billboard 200 chart in the United States at number two with 79,000 album-equivalent units, which account 68,000 copies in traditional album sales. The album's chart debut on the Billboard 200 earned Clarkson her eighth consecutive top three studio album as well her third record to debut at the second spot. Meaning of Life also debuted at the top of the Billboard Digital Albums chart and became her first entry on the Billboard Vinyl Albums chart. Overseas, the album entered the top ten of the Billboard Canadian Albums chart and the Australian ARIA Albums Chart. It also attained a top twenty debut on the Official UK Albums Chart, the Irish IRMA Artist Albums Chart, and the Swiss Hitparade chart; and a top forty entry on the national charts of Austria, Germany, and the Netherlands. The album received a RIAA Gold certification in 2021, selling 500,000 equivalent units in the US.

Track listing

Notes
 signifies a vocal producer
 signifies an additional producer

Personnel 
Credits adapted from the album's liner notes.

Recorded, engineered, mixed and mastered at

 Burbank, California 
 Hollywood, California 
 Los Angeles, California 
 Nashville, Tennessee 
 New York City, New York 
 Philadelphia, Pennsylvania 
 Tarzana, California 
 Venice Beach, California 
 Virginia Beach, Virginia 

Personnel

 Denisia "Blu June" Andrews (Novawav) – producer 
 Paul Bailey – engineer 
 David Barnett – viola 
 Brandon Blackstock – manager
 Paul Buckmaster – string arrangement 
 Julian Burg – engineer 
 BTW Productions – music preparation 
 Chris Cerullo – assistant engineer 
 Jeff Chestek – engineer 
 Joe Cleveland – keyboards 
 Jessi Collins – background vocals 
 Brittany "Chi" Coney (Novawav) – producer 
 Gared Crawford – violin 
 Andre & Sean Davidson (The Monarch) – bass, drum programming, additional programming, keyboards, producer, vocal producer 
 John DeNosky – additional vocal engineer 
 Samuel Dent – additional engineering 
 Srdjan Dimitrijevic – guitar 
 Joshua Ditty – assistant engineer 
 Ashley Donovan – makeup
 Earth, Wind & Fire Horn Section  – horns: 
 Gary Bias – tenor saxophone
 Bobby Burns – trumpet
 Raymond Lee Brown – horn orchestrator, leader, music prep
 Chuck Findley – trumpet
 Reggie Young – trombone
 Lester Estelle – drums 
 Aben Eubanks – guitar 
 Peter Filochowski – violin 
 Iain Findlay – assistant engineer , engineer 
 Glenn Fischbach – cello 
 Henry Flory – violin 
 Andreas Geck – bass 
 Chris Gehringer – mastering
 Serban Ghenea – mixer
 Greg Gigen's Dad Burke (Gregory Burke) – art direction
 Jeff "Gitty" Gitelman – guitar solo 
 Larry Gold – conductor, string arrangement 
 Jason Halbert – Hammond organ , keyboards , piano , piano , engineer, producer, programming  
 John Hanes – mixing engineer 
 Mark Hill – bass 
 Nicole Hurst – background vocals 
 Michael Harris – engineer 
 Bob Horn – vocal producer 
 Gena Johnson – assistant engineer 
 Jussi Karvinen (Jussifer) – producer 
 Craig Kallman – A&R, executive producer
 Sean Kantrowitz – guitar 
 Jessica Karpov (Harlœ) – background vocals , vocal producer 
 Jonathan Kim – viola 
 Emma Kummrow – violin 
 Greg Kurstin – drums, baritone guitar, bass synth, guitar, keyboards, mbira, piano, engineer, producer 
 Candice Lambert – styling
 Trevor Laurence Jr. – drums 
 Jennie Lorenzo – cello 
 Evon Barnes Jr. (Fade Majah) – producer 
 Luigi Mazzocchi – violin 
 Maureen McDonald (Mozella) – background vocals , vocal producer 
 Christopher McHugh – drums 
 Joel Metzler – assistant engineer 
 Justin Levy – background vocal arrangement  
 Alex Pasco – engineer 
 Will Quinnell – mastering
 Gabriel Noel – bass 
 Priscilla Renea – background vocals , vocal producer 
 Morris O'Connor – guitar 
 Orchestra members – strings :
 Jenny Bifano, Maria Conti, Janet Darnell, Conni Ellisor, Aliva Enstrom, Amy Helman, Anthony LaMarchina, Jung-Min Shin, Alan Umstead, Catherine Umstead, Mary Katherine VanOsdale, Bruce Wethey, Karen Winkelmann
 John Paris – drums 
 Charles Parker – violin 
 Vincent Peters – photography
 Eric Peterson – guitar 
 Robert Ramos – hair
 The Regiment Horns – horns, brass arrangement :
 Sean Erick – flugelhorn, trumpet
 Leon Silva – tenor saxophone, baritone saxophone
 Kevin Williams Jr. – trombone, tuba
 Shiela Richman – publicity 
 Craig Rosen – A&R administrator 
 Buddy Ross – organ , piano 
 Nick Ruth – guitar, organ, programming, producer 
 Bridget Sarai – background vocals 
 Brian Schultz – bass 
 Mick Schultz – engineer, producer 
 Jesse Shatkin – bass, concert bells, drums, drum programming, guitar, organ, piano, synthesizers, additional programming, engineer, producer, vocal producer 
 Jordan Silva – engineer , assistant engineer 
 Eddie Spear – engineer 
 Nick Spezia – engineer 
 Robert "RAab" Stevenson – background vocal arrangement 
 Todd Tidwell – assistant engineer, engineer 
 Joann Tominaga – production coordinator 
 Philip Townes – organ 
 Carolyn Tracey – project manager
 Joseph Trapanese – orchestrator, strings conductor 
 Alan Umstead – orchestra contractor 
 Nina Webb – marketing
 Carrie West – A&R coordinator 
 Booker White – music preparation 
 Verdine White – bass 
 Shane D. Wilson – engineer

Charts

Weekly charts

Year-end charts

Certifications

Release history

Notes

References

Further reading

External links 
 

2017 albums
Albums produced by Kelly Clarkson
Albums produced by Craig Kallman
Albums produced by Greg Kurstin
Albums recorded at Capitol Studios
Atlantic Records albums
Kelly Clarkson albums
Soul albums by American artists
Contemporary R&B albums by American artists
Albums recorded at Electro-Vox Recording Studios